The 1921 Lehigh Brown and White football team was an American football team that represented Lehigh University as an independent during the 1921 college football season. In its first and only season under head coach Frank Glick, the team compiled a 4–4 record and outscored opponents by a total of 138 to 105. The team played its home games at Taylor Stadium in Bethlehem, Pennsylvania.

Schedule

References

Lehigh
Lehigh Mountain Hawks football seasons
Lehigh football